James R. Martin or Jim Martin is a writer, independent producer, director, and documentary filmmaker. He is best known for his PBS feature-length documentary Wrapped In Steel, broadcast nationally in 1984–85, and PBS documentary Fired-Up Public Housing is my Home broadcast nationally in 1988–89. Both Wrapped In Steel and Fired-Up were nominated for Emmy. Fired-Up won an Emmy for Best Independent Network Documentary, Chicago. Author, Create Documentary Films, Videos, And Multimedia: a comprehensive guide to using documentary storytelling techniques for film, video, Internet and digital media projects. , Actuality Interviewing and Listening 2017 , Documentary Directing and Storytelling 2018 , Listen Learn Share 2018 .

Wrapped in Steel, a 90-minute PBS documentary, was part of the Southeast Chicago Historical Project funded by The National Endowment for The Humanities (NEH), Illinois Humanities Council (IHC) and Columbia College Chicago. The documentary focused on multi-ethnic SE Chicago Steel Mill neighborhoods at a critical time for urban America when cities were moving from dependence on a heavy industry economy.

Four years in the making, Wrapped In Steel was a part of the Southeast Chicago Historical Project which facilitated a community history project in which residents used various media to examine their past and present conditions. Project and documentary activities touched the 100,000-resident neighborhoods of South Chicago, South Deering, East Side and Hegewisch, where a large percentage of the community worked at the steel mills located in their area. In addition to the documentary film the community history project left tangible reminders of the history and culture of area residents in the neighborhood after the project ended. Some of the results of the project are two years of articles about the history of the area in The Daily Calumet (1982–1983), a multi-media exhibit at the Museum of Science and Industry (Chicago) and a revitalized local Southeast Chicago Historical Society. Prominent scholars and residents examined the culture and history of these working-class neighborhoods. Among those consultants were William Kornblum, Blue Collar Community, Sol Tax, anthropologist, Dominic Pacyga, historian, Tom Cottle, psychologist, Mike Alexandrof, President of Columbia College, Edward Sadlowski, United Steel Workers of America, and thousands of residents.

Emmy Award-winning Fired-Up: Public Housing is my Home, a 60-minute PBS documentary, looks at an attempt to introduce the Tenant Management concept to Chicago Public Housing (CHA) developments including Cabrini–Green and other developments. The Tenant Management model was based on the work of Bertha Gilkey at Cochran Gardens in St. Louis. The program sought to empower tenants to take charge of the developments and their own lives.

Fired-Up follows the residents of CHA Public Housing developments, including Cabrini–Green and Ida B Wells developments, as they learn about basic concepts like what a lease is and tenant management concepts. Female residents (over 95% public housing residents are women and children) express their fears and problems as they struggle to establish some order to their development buildings and their lives. Residents visit Cochran Gardens in St. Louis where they see a successful tenant-managed development.

The "Fired-Up" project was sponsored by the Metropolitan Planning Council of Chicago and the documentary received funding from the Kraft Foundation, American Bank, the Sophia Fund and Columbia College, Chicago. The film was written produced and directed by Professor James R (Jim) Martin at Columbia College Chicago.  Director Documentary Filmmaking, August 1994 to October 2014, Full Sail University, Winter Park, Florida. Currently Writer, Producer, Director at J R Martin Media Inc., Orlando, Florida

References

External links
https://web.archive.org/web/20080425144504/http://www.prairie.org/Films/
http://www.wttw.com/
http://www.metroplanning.org/index.asp
https://web.archive.org/web/20071018102028/http://fullsail.com/film/program/1246-documentary-filmmaking.html

1951 births
American documentary filmmakers
Writers from Chicago
Living people